Poppenbüttel railway station is on the Alster Valley line and is served by the rapid transit trains of the Hamburg S-Bahn.

It is a terminus for the city trains of the line S1 and the temporary line S11, located in the quarter Poppenbüttel of the Wandsbek borough in Hamburg, Germany

See also
Hamburger Verkehrsverbund

References

External links

DB station information 

Hamburg S-Bahn stations in Hamburg
Buildings and structures in Wandsbek
Railway stations in Germany opened in 1918